Charles V. Mather (April 17, 1915 – May 20, 2006) was an American football coach. He served as the head football coach at the University of Kansas from 1954 until 1957, compiling a record of 11–26–3.

Mather was the high school coach of Don James, who started his coaching career under Mather at Kansas as a graduate assistant. James was later a head coach at Kent State (1971–1974) and Washington (1975–1992).

Head coaching record

College

References

External links
 

1915 births
2006 deaths
Chicago Bears coaches
Kansas Jayhawks football coaches
High school football coaches in Ohio
Ohio Northern University alumni
Sportspeople from Steubenville, Ohio